Saint-Pierre-le-Vieux is a commune in the Seine-Maritime department in the Normandy region in north-western France.

Geography

Population

Places of interest
 The church of St.Pierre, dating from the eleventh century.
 The sixteenth-century château de Saint-Pierre-le-Vieux, with a vaulted ceiling.
 The château and park of Bosc le Comte, dating from the sixteenth century.

See also
Communes of the Seine-Maritime department

References

External links

Saint-Pierre-le-Vieux on the Quid website 

Communes of Seine-Maritime